Cheng Yung-jen (born 24 January 1977) is a Taiwanese football player who as of 2008 played as a defender for Taiwan Power Company F.C. Most of the time he was the sweeper for the team. He was appointed defensive midfielder for the Chinese Taipei national football team after new manager Toshiaki Imai joined in January 2006.

Career statistics

Honours
With Taiwan Power Company F.C.
Enterprise Football League: 2007

References

1977 births
Living people
Taiwan Power Company F.C. players
Taiwanese footballers

Association football defenders